Katakatala Rudrayya is a 1978 Indian Telugu-language film written and directed by Dasari Narayana Rao. It stars Krishnam Raju, Jayasudha, Ramakrishna and Jayachitra. The film hasmusic composed by J. V. Raghavulu. It is remade in Tamil as Pattakkathi Bhairavan (1979) with Sivaji Ganesan and in Hindi (1980) as Jyoti Bane Jwala with Jeetendra.

Cast
 Krishnam Raju
 Jayasudha
 Ramakrishna
 Jayachitra
 Jamuna
 Kaikala Satyanarayana
 Rao Gopal Rao
 Prabhakar Reddy
 J. V. Ramana Murthi

Reception

Critical reception 
Griddaluru Gopalrao writing for Zamin Ryot on 27 October 1978 opined that the film was cut off from reality, and would remain as "an old coin which is no longer a legal tender." He added that the screenplay by Dasari and soundtrack composed by Raghavulu are forgettable.

Box office 
Katakataala Rudrayya and Mana Voori Pandavulu were released within a gap of 10 days.

References

External links

1978 films
Films directed by Dasari Narayana Rao
Films scored by J. V. Raghavulu
Indian action films
Telugu films remade in other languages
1970s Telugu-language films
1978 action films